Qyqavica is a mountain situated at the center of Kosovo with a length of about  and a width of about . It is in the boundary line between the Drenica region and the Kosovo Plain. The river Sitnica passes close by it. The village of Stanovci is located to the right of the mountain. Large towns and cities like Prishtina, Vushtri and Obiliq are located close by the mountain.

During the 1998-1999 Kosovo War many villagers took refuge in the mountain until the war ended.

Notes and references

Notes:

References:

Mountains of Kosovo
Drenica